Saint-Nazaire-d'Acton is a parish municipality in central Quebec, Canada in Acton Regional County Municipality. The population as of the Canada 2011 Census was 826.

Demographics 

Population trend:

Mother tongue language (2006)

Communities
Royville
Saint-Nazaire

See also
List of parish municipalities in Quebec

References

External links
Regional County Municipality of Acton - Profile of Saint-Nazaire-d'Acton.

Parish municipalities in Quebec
Incorporated places in Acton Regional County Municipality